V4743 Sagittarii was a bright nova in the southern constellation of Sagittarius. This event was discovered by K. Haseda and colleagues in September 2002. It peaked at magnitude 5.0 on September 20, 2002, then declined rapidly thereafter. It reached a peak temperature of  around April 2003 and remained at that level for at least five months, suggesting the white dwarf component has a mass of 1.1–. The distance to this system is uncertain.

Observations of the nova by the Chandra X-ray Observatory taken 180 days after the event showed an amplitude variation with a period of about 22 minutes. The X-ray output was dropping rapidly, and changed from a continuous spectrum to one showing emission lines. X-ray light curves of this system show a periodic signal with a frequency of  that suggests a rapidly rotating magnetic white dwarf in an intermediate polar system. A proposed beat period of ~24 minutes has been detected in the optical in between the orbital and period cycles.

References

Novae
Intermediate polars
Sagittarius (constellation)
Astronomical objects discovered in 2002
Sagittarii, V4743